The 14th Bangladesh National Film Awards, presented by Ministry of Information, Bangladesh to felicitate the best of Bangladeshi Cinema released in the year 1989. The ceremony took place in Dhaka and awards were given by then President of Bangladesh. The National Film Awards are the only film awards given by the government itself. Every year, a national panel appointed by the government selects the winning entry, and the award ceremony is held in Dhaka. 1989 was the 14th National Film Awards.

List of winners
This year awards were given in 16 categories. Awards for Best Film was not given in 1989.

Merit Awards

Technical Awards

See also
Bachsas Awards
Meril Prothom Alo Awards
Ifad Film Club Award
Babisas Award

References

External links

National Film Awards (Bangladesh) ceremonies
1989 film awards
1989 awards in Bangladesh
1989 in Dhaka